The Rollemberg–Vuolo Road–Railway Bridge (in Portuguese, Ponte Rodoferroviária Rollemberg-Vuolo) is a double-decker bridge (road on the upper level and railway track at the lower level) over the Parana River, between the states of Mato Grosso do Sul and São Paulo in Brazil.

The bridge was inaugurated in 1998 and connects the roads SP-320 and MS-316. It has  of length. Its name pays homage to Brazilian deputy  and to senator , for their strong support to the construction of the bridge.

See also 
 List of road-rail bridges

References

Railway bridges in Brazil
Bridges in Brazil
Buildings and structures in Mato Grosso do Sul
Buildings and structures in São Paulo (state)
Transport in Mato Grosso do Sul
Transport in São Paulo (state)
Double-decker bridges